Zandani is a town and union council of Dera Ismail Khan District in Khyber-Pakhtunkhwa province of Pakistan. It is located at 31°48'50N 70°40'35E and has an altitude of 174 metres (574 feet).

References

Union councils of Dera Ismail Khan District
Populated places in Dera Ismail Khan District